Aírton Batista dos Santos (19 May 1942 – 18 February 1996), known as Aírton Beleza, was a Brazilian footballer.

References

1942 births
1996 deaths
Brazilian footballers
Association football forwards
Botafogo de Futebol e Regatas players
CR Flamengo footballers
Pan American Games medalists in football
Pan American Games gold medalists for Brazil
Footballers at the 1963 Pan American Games
Medalists at the 1963 Pan American Games